Manjari Joshi is a TV newsreader/anchor of the Indian public service broadcast television network Doordarshan.

Career
Manjari got her schooling from Sardar Patel Vidyalaya, New Delhi. She pursued her graduation in Chemistry (Hons) from Miranda College of University of Delhi. She later turned towards Russian and received her post graduation from Jawaharlal Nehru University. She is a translator of Russian to English and Hindi. She has written articles for newspapers. She teaches television journalism.

Bibliography
 Selected Works of Abai Kunnanbev (अबई कुनानबेव चयनिका) (1995), (Translations: Hem Chandra Pande, Variyam Singh, Manjari Joshi, Archana Upaddhyaya), Sahitya Academy, New Delhi 
 Bharatiya Sangeet ki Parampara (भारतीय संगीत की परंपरा) (2002), National Book Trust, New Delhi. 
 Writing for Media (2011), (co-author Hemant Joshi), Vikas Publishing House, New Delhi. 
 Fundamentals of Journalism and Mass Communication (2011), (co-author Prof. Hemant Joshi), Vikas Publishing House, New Delhi. 
 Communication for Development (2011), (co-author Hemant Joshi), Vikas Publishing House, New Delhi.

References

External links
 Manjari Joshi's Video Interview
 NRAI, New Delhi

Indian television news anchors
Indian women television journalists
Journalists from Uttar Pradesh
Writers from Lucknow
Indian women translators
Indian women television presenters
Living people
Doordarshan journalists
Jawaharlal Nehru University alumni
Translators from Russian
Translators to Hindi
Delhi University alumni
20th-century Indian journalists
20th-century Indian women writers
Women writers from Uttar Pradesh
20th-century Indian translators
21st-century Indian women writers
21st-century Indian journalists
1960 births